Amitav Banerji (born 5 December 1926) is an Indian former judge who was Chief Justice of the Allahabad High Court.

Career
Banerji was educated at A.B.I. College, Allahabad and passed law from the Allahabad University. He was enrolled as an advocate on 27 August 1951 and started practice in the Allahabad High Court. Banerji worked on Criminal matters as well as the Civil, Constitution and Company matters. In 1973 he was appointed Additional Judge of the Allahabad High Court and became permanent Judge on 4 August 1975. Justice Banerji was elevated in the post of the Chief Justice of the Allahabad High Court on 16 July 1987 and retired on  6 November 1988.

References

1926 births
Possibly living people
Indian judges
Chief Justices of the Allahabad High Court
Judges of the Allahabad High Court
University of Allahabad alumni
20th-century Indian judges
20th-century Indian lawyers
21st-century Indian judges